The following is a sortable list of films produced or shot in Niger.

See also
 Cinema of Niger

References

External links
 Marfilmes website - African film distributor
 Nigerien film at the Internet Movie Database

Niger

Films